The Anlo are a sub-group of the Ewe people.

Anlo may also refer to:

Anlo (Ghana parliament constituency), constituency represented in the Parliament of Ghana
ANLO, student corporation of the University of Louvain (UCLouvain)